Pararothia is a genus of moths of the family Noctuidae. The genus was erected by Sergius G. Kiriakoff in 1974.

Species
 Pararothia camilla Oberthür, 1923
 Pararothia gracilis Jordan, 1913
 Pararothia vieui Viette, 1966

References

Agaristinae